The whiskered screech owl (Megascops trichopsis) is a small screech owl found in North and Central America.

Description
Adults occur in 2 color morphs, in either brown or dark grey plumage. They have a round head with ear tufts, yellow eyes and a yellowish bill. The bird looks very similar to a western screech owl, but has heavier barring on the breast, and is slightly smaller in size. They are 6.3 to 7.9 in and have a wingspan of 17.3 in.

Range and habitat
The whiskered screech owl's range extends from southeasternmost Arizona (the Madrean sky islands region) in the United States, southwards through Mexico, Guatemala, El Salvador, Honduras, to north central Nicaragua. Their breeding habitat is dense coniferous or oak woodlands, and coffee plantations usually occurring at higher elevations than the western screech owl.

Behavior
These birds wait on a perch and swoop down on prey; they also capture targeted food items in flight. They mainly eat small mammals and large insects, with grasshoppers, beetles, and moths making up a large portion of their diet but, they also eat katydids and scorpions .  They are active at night or near dusk, using their excellent hearing and night vision to locate prey.

The most common call is a series of about 8 regularly spaced "boo" notes, slightly higher in the middle, slightly lower at each end.

3 to 4 eggs are usually laid in April or May, usually found in a tree cavity or old woodpecker hole 5 to 7 meters above the ground.

Subspecies
There are 3 recognized subspecies: 
Megascops trichopsis aspersus Brewster, 1888
Megascops trichopsis mesamericanus (Van Rossem, 1932)
Megascops trichopsis trichopsis (Wagler, 1832)

References

 "National Geographic"  Field Guide to the Birds of North America 
Handbook of the Birds of the World Vol 5, Josep del Hoyo editor, 
"National Audubon Society" The Sibley Guide to Birds, by David Allen Sibley,

External links

Photo-High Res; Article "Birds of Honduras"
Whiskered Screech Owl photo gallery VIREO

Megascops
Birds of Guatemala
Birds of El Salvador
Birds of Honduras
Birds of Nicaragua
Native birds of the Southwestern United States
Birds of Mexico
Natural history of the Mexican Plateau
Birds of the Sierra Madre Occidental
Birds of the Sierra Madre Oriental
Birds of the Sierra Madre del Sur
Birds of the Trans-Mexican Volcanic Belt
Birds described in 1832
Taxa named by Johann Georg Wagler
Owls of North America